Itai Chammah (born 11 November 1985 in Yavne) is an Israeli swimmer who represented Israel at the 2008 Summer Olympics.

Biography
Chammah is Jewish.

Chammah competed on behalf of Israel at the 2008 Summer Olympics in Beijing, China.

References

External links
 

1985 births
Living people
Israeli male swimmers
Olympic swimmers of Israel
Swimmers at the 2008 Summer Olympics
Maccabiah Games medalists in swimming
Maccabiah Games gold medalists for Israel
Maccabiah Games bronze medalists for Israel
Jewish swimmers
Israeli Jews
People from Yavne